Brian Matthew Isoa Shima (born December 22, 1981) is a former professional inline skater. He also holds the record for the most pro skates held by any person. Shima owned his own skate brand, named Shima Skate Manufacturing, also known as SSM, which was launched after he abandoned his former company NIMH.  He is also co-founder of the World Rolling Series.

Coming from rollerblading brands like USD (universal skate design) & Razor Skates, he was, along with Jon Elliot, a former pro skater, co-owner and team rider of Ground Control-Frames, NIMH Skates, 4x4 Wheels, Vicious Bearings, King Crow bearings and Shima Skate Manufacturing. Along with Jon Elliott and Jan Welch, Shima started a distribution company called Rat Tail in 2002.

Competitions 
1994 Sea Otter Classic - Monterey, CA - 1st
2000 ASA Amateur Finals - Las Vegas, NV - 1st
April 8, 2001 IMYTA #2 - Paris, France - 1st
2001 Gravity Games - 4th
2001 ASA Pro Tour - Anaheim, California - 1st 
2001 Eisenberg's Hoedown - Plano, Texas - 1st
2001 IMYTA #3 - Detroit, MI - 2nd
2002 Gravity Games - 2nd
2002 Superhick - Atlanta, GA
2002 Eisenberg's Hoedown - Plano, Texas - 3rd
2002 Eisenberg's Hoedown - Plano, Texas - 1st Best Trick
July 7, 2002 IMYTA #8 - Montreal, Canada - 1st
2002 ASA World Championships - 19th 
2002 ASA Pro Tour - San Diego, California - 17th 
2003 RFCC Tour Contest (915 Skatepark) - Greensboro, NC - 2nd
2003 RFCC Tour Contest (Vertigo Skatepark) - Boardman, OH - 1st
2003 Superhick - Atlanta, Georgia - 1st
2003 RFCC World Finals (Airborne Skatepark) - Detroit, MI - 1st
November 13, 2004 - RFCC World Finals - Kona, FL - 2nd
2004 Barn Burner - Renton, WA - 1st
2004 Eisenberg's Hoedown - Plano, Texas - 2nd
2005 Fise Competition - Montpellier, France - 1st
May 30, 2005 LG Action Sports Tour - Cincinnati, Ohio - 1st 
2005 LG Action Sports Tour - Paris, France - 8th
2005 LG Action Sports Tour - Munich, Germany - 3rd 
2005 LG Action Sports Championship, Manchester, UK - 3rd 
2005 LG Action Sports Tour - Sacramento, California - 10th (VERT)
2008 Asian X Games - Shanghai, China - 5th 
2008 Bitter Cold Showdown - Bordman, Ohio - 4th 
2008 LG Action Sports Tour - Seattle, Washington - 4th 
2009 Barn Burner - Seattle, Washington - 1st
2009 Australian Rolling Open  - Melbourne, Australia- 3rd
2009 FISE - Montpellier, France - 10th
2010 Bitter Cold Showdown - Detroit, Michigan - 8th
2011 Bitter Cold Showdown - Detroit, Michigan - 9th

Signature products 

Hardgoods
Fifty-50 Shima Grindplate (1999)
Medium Rat Bastard Wheel
Mindgame Shima Wheel
4x4 Shima Edition 1 Wheel 60mm/88a
4x4 Shima Edition 2 Wheel 60mm/88a
4x4 Shima Edition 3 Wheel 58mm/89a
4x4 Shima Hi-Lo Wheel 56mm/90a
4x4 Shima Hi-Lo Wheel 47mm/90a
Ground Control Hi-lo Shima frame
Ground Control Featherlite Shima frame

Filmography 
Brian has appeared in several videos such as:
 Children of the Night (c) 1996 Medium
 Film of the Year (C) 1997 Medium
 Espionage (C) 1997 PRN
 Smell the Glove (C) 1998 Medium
 Amateur (C) 1998 Joe Navran
 Elements 2 (C) 1999 PRN
 United Front (C) 2000 Jan Welch
 Brain Fear Gone (C) 2000 Trendkiller
 Coup de Tat (C) 2000 Joe Navran & USD
 UnCloned. Razor team Video 2001
 What Do You Believe In? (C) 2001 Trendkiller
 Concentration (C) 2001 Escozoo Media
 United Front 2: Trash (C) 2003 Jan Welch
 Razor's Closer (C) 2003 Beau Cottington & Razor's
 8th Annual Hoedown (C) 2004 Jason Reyna Project
 Leading The Blind (C) 2004 Jan Welch/Patrick Lennen & 4x4 Urethane
 Ego (C) 2004 Adam Johnson & Razor's
 Killer Boots (C) 2005 Artistry Productions
 Barely Dead (C) 2006 Misled Media
 Drip Drop (C) 2008 Old Apple Films
 Nimh Video'' (C) 2011 Monk & Race

References

External links
Shima Skate Manufacturing SSM
Rat Tail Distribution
Brian Shima Interviews, Photos, News on Be-mag.com
Lifelounge Interview via Toxboe.net
LgActionSports- Shima Biography
Wood Street Guitar Repair

Aggressive inline skaters
1981 births
Living people
American skaters